Callwood is a surname.  Notable people with the surname include:

 Brett Callwood (born 1975), English journalist, copy writer, editor, and author
 June Callwood (1924–2007), Canadian journalist, writer, and activist